KFSN-TV (channel 30) is a television station in Fresno, California, United States, serving as the market's ABC network outlet. It is owned and operated by the network's ABC Owned Television Stations division, and maintains studios on G Street in downtown Fresno; its transmitter is located on Bear Mountain, near Meadow Lakes, California.

Fresno is the smallest television market in California with a "Big Four" network O&O.

History

KFRE
After the Federal Communications Commission (FCC)'s four-year-long freeze on awarding television station licenses was lifted in 1952, two radio stations—KARM (1430 AM, now KFIG) and KFRE (940 AM, now KYNO) competed for the construction permit to operate a station on channel 12, the sole VHF allocation given to Fresno. KFRE won the permit, and the station first signed on the air on May 10, 1956, as KFRE-TV (for Fresno). It is the third-oldest television station in the Fresno market in a three-year timeframe and upon signing on, KFRE-TV took the CBS affiliation from KJEO (channel 47, now KGPE).  This made Fresno one of the smallest markets where each network gained full-time affiliations at the time.

The KFRE stations were acquired by Triangle Publications in 1959. On February 17, 1961, KFRE-TV reluctantly moved to UHF channel 30 to make Fresno an all-UHF market under orders from the FCC. It was known by the term deintermixture, the move was made for the purpose of leveling the playing field and eliminating the potential of unfair competition between the VHF and UHF bands. A similar situation occurred in nearby Bakersfield where that city's lone VHF station, KERO-TV on channel 10, moved to UHF channel 23 in 1963. The move of KFRE-TV to channel 30 opened up channel 12 for use by KCOY-TV in Santa Maria, which went on the air in 1964.

KFSN

Triangle began its exit from broadcasting in 1971, and sold the KFRE stations to Capital Cities Communications. The new owners sold off the AM and FM radio stations as a condition of the purchase and kept the television station, changing its call letters to KFSN-TV on May 1 of that year (the KFRE-TV calls are now used on Fresno's CW affiliate on channel 59; that station is unrelated to the current KFSN-TV).

On March 18, 1985, Capital Cities announced it would purchase ABC. Nearly six months later, on September 9, 1985, KFSN-TV traded network affiliations with KJEO and became an ABC affiliate. The transaction was finalized on January 3, 1986, making channel 30 an ABC owned-and-operated station. It marks the first time a Big Three network owns a UHF television station since NBC sold WNBC (now WVIT) in New Britain, Connecticut, to Plains Television in 1960. In 1996, The Walt Disney Company acquired Capital Cities/ABC.

KFSN-TV shut down its analog signal, over UHF channel 30, at noon on June 12, 2009, the official date in which full-power television stations in the United States transitioned from analog to digital broadcasts under federal mandate. The station's digital signal relocated from its pre-transition VHF channel 9 to UHF channel 30.

ABC News Now was launched in 2004 on digital subchannels of ABC O&O stations and lasting until January 31, 2005, as the channel ended its experimental phase. The group changed its programming on secondary channels to ABC Plus, a local news and public affairs format. ABC teamed up with AccuWeather to launch a multicast service starting on ABC stations' third subchannel with the second station taking on the service was KFSN-TV in late 2005. On April 27, 2009, KFSN began carrying the Live Well Network on a second digital subchannel digital subchannel.

The station carried a Live Well Network standard definition simulcast was carried on digital subchannel 30.3 until it was replaced with Laff on April 15, 2015. ABC Owned Television Stations took its Localish digital media venture promoted by KFSN and other stations then rebranded its Live Well Network as Localish on February 17, 2020.

Programming
As of 2022, five current syndicated programs on KFSN are shared with most of the other ABC-owned stations: Live with Kelly and Ryan (produced by network flagship WABC-TV), Tamron Hall, Rachael Ray, Jeopardy! and Wheel of Fortune.

KFSN-TV serves as the production company for two programs seen on the Live Well Network, now called Localish, Motion and My Family Recipe Rocks.

News operation

KFSN-TV presently broadcasts 39 hours of locally produced newscasts each week (with 6 hours each weekday and 3 hours each on Saturdays and Sundays); in regards to the number of hours devoted to news programming, it is the highest local newscast output among the broadcast television stations in the Fresno market. Unlike most ABC affiliates in the Pacific Time Zone, the station does not broadcast a 5:30 p.m. newscast on weekdays, opting to fill the half-hour with ABC World News Tonight (as a result of that program airing one hour earlier that other ABC stations in the time zone, KFSN airs an extension of its 6:00 p.m. newscast in World News recommended 6:30 timeslot). In addition, the station produces the public affairs program Valley Focus, which airs Sunday mornings at 10:00 a.m.

KFSN has dominated the local news ratings in the San Joaquin Valley for decades, dating back to its pre-ABC-merger years as a CBS affiliate. Its 5 p.m. newscast, Live at Five frequently attracts more viewers than all other area stations combined. The station's newscasts are not branded Eyewitness News, nor does it use the Gari Media Group-composed "Eyewitness News" music package, like most of ABC's other owned-and-operated stations. Instead, KFSN retains the Action News branding made famous at Philadelphia sister station WPVI-TV, when the format debuted on that station in 1970. KFSN also used the original version of 615 Music's "News One" music package from 1994 to 2014, also used at the time by San Francisco sister station, KGO-TV.

In 2003, the station began pooling resources with sister stations KABC-TV in Los Angeles and KGO-TV to hire a full-time reporter and photographer to staff a Sacramento bureau following Arnold Schwarzenegger's election as Governor during the 2003 California recall election; the Sacramento bureau was shut down in September 2013. On April 23, 2007, beginning with the 5 p.m. newscast, KFSN-TV became the seventh ABC owned-and-operated station to begin broadcasting their local newscasts in high definition (following its sister stations KABC-TV, WPVI-TV, WABC-TV in New York City, WLS-TV in Chicago, KGO-TV in San Francisco and KTRK-TV in Houston) and updated its news branding to ABC 30 Action News HD.

On September 12, 2011, KFSN launched an hour-long 4:00 p.m. newscast, which replaced The Oprah Winfrey Show. This follows the trend of the four other sister stations (WABC-TV, WPVI-TV, KGO-TV and WTVD in Durham, North Carolina) that started their own 4:00 p.m. newscast after Oprah ended its syndication run. On January 7, 2013, KFSN began producing a half-hour 10:00 p.m. newscast for MyNetworkTV affiliate KAIL (channel 7); the program, titled ABC 30 Action News Live at 10:00, ended in July 2014.

Notable former on-air staff
 Laura Diaz – anchor (1981–1983; later at KABC-TV and KCBS-TV/KCAL-TV in Los Angeles; now at KTTV)
 Karen Humphrey – reporter (1970s; later Mayor of Fresno)

Subchannels
The station's digital signal is multiplexed:

References

 BroadcastPioneers.com: A History of the WFIL Stations

External links

ABC Owned Television Stations
ABC network affiliates
This TV affiliates
FSN-TV
Television channels and stations established in 1956
1956 establishments in California